Elathur State assembly constituency is one of the 140 state legislative assembly constituencies in Kerala state in southern India. It is also one of the 7 state legislative assembly constituencies included in the Kozhikode Lok Sabha constituency. As of the 2021 assembly election, the current MLA is A. K. Saseendran of Nationalist Congress Party.

Local self governed segments
Elathur Niyama Sabha constituency is composed of the following 6 wards of the Kozhikode Municipal Corporation (Elathur) in Kozhikode Taluk, and 6 Gram Panchayats in the same Taluk:

Members of Legislative Assembly 
The following list contains all members of Kerala legislative assembly who have represented the constituency:

Key

Election Results

Niyamasabha Election 2021 
There were 2,03,267 registered voters in the constituency for the 2021 election.

Niyamasabha Election 2016 
There were 1,88,528 registered voters in the constituency for the 2016 election.

Niyamasabha Election 2011 
There were 1,62,830 registered voters in the constituency for the 2011 election.

See also 
 Elathur
 Kozhikode district
 List of constituencies of the Kerala Legislative Assembly
 2016 Kerala Legislative Assembly election

References 

Assembly constituencies of Kerala

State assembly constituencies in Kozhikode district